Tanygrisiau railway station is a passenger station on the narrow gauge Ffestiniog Railway The line was built in 1836 to carry dressed slate from Blaenau Ffestiniog to Porthmadog for export by sea but official passenger services began in 1865.

The station serves the slate mining village of Tanygrisiau and was opened in March 1866. It closed to passengers on 15 September 1939. The new station opened for passenger traffic on 24 June 1978 and was the passenger terminus until 25 May 1982.

The new station is on a different alignment and grade from the old, the two alignments joining just to the north of the Blaenau end of the station. The old line was on a continuous downward gradient from that point through the station, but the new line is on an uphill gradient (to pass the nearby power station) and is more sharply curved. One of the old buildings still remains, visibly lower than the new trackbed.

Tanygrisiau station has an operational passing loop but is normally operated as an unstaffed halt and trains only call on request. Intending passengers are advised to check with the Ffestiniog Railway Company before embarking on their journey.

The station is close to the Cwmorthin water falls, and the train passes Tanygrisiau hydro-electric pumped-storage power station and Llyn Ystradau.

Services

Sources 

 
 
 Brian Hollingsworth: Ffestiniog Adventure - The Festiniog Railway's Deviation Project, 1981.
 J.G.V.Mitchell & A.G.W.Garraway; Return to Blaenau 1970-82, 2001
 The Ffestiniog Railway Company's website
 Ffestiniog Railway Timetables

Further reading

Railway stations in Great Britain opened in 1866
Railway stations in Great Britain closed in 1939
Railway stations in Great Britain opened in 1978
Heritage railway stations in Gwynedd
Ffestiniog Railway
Ffestiniog